The Zimbabwe National Army (ZNA) is the primary branch of the Zimbabwe Defence Forces responsible for land-oriented military operations. It is the largest service branch under the Zimbabwean Joint Operations Command (JOC). The modern army has its roots in the Rhodesian Army, which was raised between 1963 and 1964 after the breakup of the Federation of Rhodesia and Nyasaland. A Joint High Command created in March 1980 to oversee integration of the formerly belligerent Rhodesian Security Forces, Zimbabwe African National Liberation Army (ZANLA), and the Zimbabwe People's Revolutionary Army (ZIPRA) officially established the Zimbabwe National Army in late 1980, nearly a year after the end of the Rhodesian Bush War.

The mission statement of the army is "to defend the sovereignty, territorial integrity and national interests of Zimbabwe and to contribute to international peace and security" a mandate the force has been able live up to in the region. It is considered an integral component of the JOC, and falls under the ultimate authority of the President of Zimbabwe. The ZNA is directed by a Chief of the Army, the senior official being an Army Chief of Staff. Zimbabwe's highest ranking army officer as of August 2021 is Lt. Gen. David SIgauke. In 2011, Harare continued to maintain a statutory strength of 40,000 active personnel; actual numbers hover closer to 30,000. ZNA reserves claim another 21,800, putting the combined component strength total at approximately 51,800.

History

Origins

The origins of the Zimbabwe National Army lie in the formation of the Southern Rhodesia Volunteers in 1898, a mounted corps supported by bicycles, a signal troop, and engineers. Raised by colonial authorities to suppress further uprisings after the Second Matabele War, it included a "Western division" and an "Eastern division" staffed by European volunteers. Field outings were conducted in concert with the British South Africa Police (BSAP).

In the 1890s, the nature of this force changed following the outbreak of the Second Boer War. In 1899, the Royal Rhodesia Regiment was founded, and by the time Salisbury joined the Central African Federation there were three battalions. As Southern Rhodesia was the dominant territory in the federation, its officers represented the senior commanders in charge of all federal units. During this period Southern Rhodesians served overseas on active duty for the British Empire, most notably in Malaya, Kuwait, and Aden.

When the federation was dissolved in 1963, Southern Rhodesia retained the personnel raised in its territory, including the largest proportion of white soldiers – some 3,400 of the 7,000 men who served in the defunct Federal Army. Over objections raised by newly independent African governments in Northern Rhodesia (Zambia) and Nyasaland (Malawi), it also claimed the majority of armoured vehicles and the potent strike aircraft of the Royal Rhodesian Air Force.

Recruitment and training for an insurgent campaign against the colony's administration by rival African nationalists from the Zimbabwe African People's Union (ZAPU) and the Zimbabwe African National Union (ZANU) began in 1963, and intensified after Rhodesia's Unilateral Declaration of Independence in 1965. The Rhodesian Bush War, which lasted roughly fifteen years until late 1979, resulted in the creation of two major insurgent armies, expansion of the Rhodesian Army, and militarisation of local society. By 1980 there were an estimated 150,000 Zimbabweans with military training or experience, access to arms, and allegiance to an established political organisation. Conscription had been introduced in 1955, and the National Service Act in 1976 provided for 12 months of full-time military service regardless of rank. Three-year reservist obligations for white, Coloured, and Asian males also continued. Personnel strength of the regular army peaked at 20,000 active members (half of them whites) and 2,300 with the air force. The paramilitary BSAP had 11,000 police and a reserve of 35,000. These uniform commands and others – including 20,000 Security Force Auxiliaries loyal to interim politicians and a 3,500-man Guard Force for securing protected villages – fell under the authority of Combined Operations (COMOPS), headed by Lieutenant-General Peter Walls.

Integration
The Zimbabwe National Army was formed in 1980 from elements of the Rhodesian Army, integrated to a greater or lesser extent with combatants from the Zimbabwe African National Liberation Army (ZANLA) and Zimbabwe People's Revolutionary Army (ZIPRA) guerrilla movements (the armed wings of, respectively, the Zimbabwe African National Union (ZANU) and Zimbabwe African People's Union (ZAPU).

Following majority rule in April 1980 and the cantonment of the ZANLA and ZIPRA under Operation Midford, British Army trainers (the British Military Advisory and Training Team, BMATT) oversaw the integration of guerrilla fighters into one unified army. A battalion structure was overlaid on the existing Rhodesian Army. For the first year a system was followed where the top-performing candidate became battalion commander. If he or she was from ZANLA, then his or her second-in-command was the top-performing ZIPRA candidate, and vice versa. This ensured a balance between the two movements in the command structure. From early 1981 this system was abandoned in favour of political appointments, and ZANLA/ZANU fighters consequently quickly formed the majority of battalion commanders in the ZNA.

The ZNA was originally formed into four brigades, 1 Brigade, Matabeleland, 2 Brigade, Mashonaland, 3 Brigade, Manicaland, and 4 Brigade, Masavingo. These comprised a total of 29 battalions. The brigade support units were composed almost entirely of specialists of the former Rhodesian Army, while unintegrated battalions of the Rhodesian African Rifles were assigned to the 1st, 3rd and 4th Brigades. A 5th was formed in 1981 and deployed primarily against ex-ZIPRA dissidents until 1987. The unit was later implicated in an extrajudicial purge of suspected dissidents and their supporters, known as Gukurahundi.

From August 2021, the ZNA is under the command of Lt General David Sigauke, who took over from General Edzai Absolom Chanyuka Chimonyo following the latter's death.

Operations

Mozambique Civil War

Raids on Gorongosa
Some Mozambican National Resistance (RENAMO) elements had crossed from Mozambique into Zimbabwe several times, had robbed some shops along the border and had burned down a timber factory. After several meetings with Mozambican officials it was agreed that the ZDF could pursue into Mozambique any RENAMO elements that might have raided Zimbabwe. This was the basis on which the ZDF started planning follow-up operations which took them deep into Mozambique culminating in occupation of former RENAMO bases at Gorongosa.

Operation Lemon
The first of these Zimbabwe Defence Forces (ZDF) follow-up operations was launched from Katiyo and Aberdeen in northern Manicaland, code-named Operation Lemon. The operation lasted from 5–9 December 1984. It comprised elements of 3 Infantry Brigade, the Special Forces of Zimbabwe the 1 Parachute Regiment , Zimbabwe Special Air Service (SAS), and was supported by the Air Force of Zimbabwe (AFZ). Bad weather conditions and the difficult mountainous terrain reduced the use of aircraft, and all the trooping had to be done by helicopters. The movement of troops on the ground was also difficult. Four contacts were made and two RENAMO bases were destroyed. However, most RENAMO elements in the bases managed to escape and only eight were captured.

The ZDF considered this operation as a major failure and the code word Lemon was co-opted to mean any failure in all subsequent operations. It was further established that there were no other permanent bases in the area, only some advance posts and temporary bases used by RENAMO as launching pads for food raids into Zimbabwe. It was also revealed for the first time that the main RENAMO bases were at Messinse, Chito, Nyazonia, Buetoni, Gorongosa Central Base and Casa Banana.

Operation Grape Fruit
The report for Operation Lemon was taken seriously by the commanders of the ZDF, and in July 1985 preparations for major offensive operations were started. Rehearsals for a Fireforce operation were carried out at Inkomo Barracks near Harare. Three infantry brigades were mobilised together with the Parachute Group, One Commando Battalion and the AFZ. Men and equipment were moved to Chimoio in Mozambique, with a Forward Replenishment Point (FRP) being established at Grand Reef near Mutare.

Intelligence sources had indicated that RENAMO's main regional base in Manica province was at Muxamba and that Casa Banana was the national stronghold of RENAMO. Both bases had to be attacked and Muxamba was targeted first, being only 70 kilometres south of Chimoio. The most important consideration however, was the hope that activities around Muxamba might divert RENAMO's attention from monitoring too closely the movement of the three heavily armed Zimbabwean infantry battalions marching from Chimoio towards the Gorongosa Mountains.

Muxamba was believed to hold at least 400 RENAMO elements commanded by Major General Mabachi. The attack on Muxamba was launched on 20 August 1985 by elements of 3 Brigade, supported by the Parachute Group and the AFZ. The operation went on for four days with minor problems for the ZDF. One helicopter was riddled with small arms fire but managed to return to Chimoio.

Raid on Cassa Banana
Intelligence sources had indicated that Cassa Banana, RENAMO's national headquarters had a strength of 400 elements. However, the organisation maintained a string of other smaller bases along the Gorongosa Mountains, which were considered as part of the main base. This raised the total estimated strength in the area to 1,000 elements. During the night of 27 August 1985, three Zimbabwe infantry battalions were established in their Form Up Points (FUP) with the help of the SAS and Commando elements. At Chimoio a Fireforce was being given final briefing, and five AFZ planes were given orders for a first light take-off for Gorongosa on the morning of 28 August.

Although the RENAMO elements captured at Katiyo had given a grid reference for Cassa Banana, further intelligence had cast some doubt as to which of the several RENAMO bases scattered on all sides of the Gorongosa Mountains was the actual headquarters of RENAMO. It was because of this uncertainty that the Fireforce was divided into three sections each with one helicopter gunship, two transport helicopters and two transport aircraft with paratroopers.

Each Fireforce section was detailed to attack specific suspected RENAMO positions around the Gorongossa Mountains. It was during this three pronged attack that one helicopter flew overhead Cassa Banana airstrip and the pilot noticed a green pickup truck disappearing into some bushes. It was then that the pilot recognised the place as that given at the briefing as Cassa Banana. The jets from Thornhill, which were already in place overhead a predetermined Initial Point (IP), were then talked on to the target, and the raid on Cassa Banana began.

The aircraft attacked the target, knocking out several Anti-Aircraft gun positions. Two helicopter gunships continued to hit suspected strategic positions and managed to flash out several pockets of resistance. A third helicopter was directing the dropping of the first wave of paratroopers. When the paratroopers had entered the base, the infantry battalions, which were close by, were ordered to move in and occupy strategic positions. The Fireforce then moved on to deal with the several pockets of resistance from the smaller RENAMO bases all along the Gorongosa Mountains. It took the whole day to silence all of these pockets of resistance.

There is no official Zimbabwean record of the number of casualties on the first raid on Cassa Banana. However, considering the amount of effort, the numbers of troops involved on both sides, and the time it took to capture the base, there must have been a lot of deaths and injuries on both sides.

Operation Lifeline
This corridor is a tarred  road running from Nyamapanda on the Zimbabwean border through the Mozambican city of Tete to Zobue on the Malawi border. After UDI in 1965, this route carried Rhodesian goods to and from Malawi, which had not applied United Nations sanctions against the Smith regime. After the independence of Mozambique in 1975, the bulk of Malawi's trade with South Africa went through Rhodesia by road via Tete. It was only in 1984 that trade via this route declined because of RENAMO attacks.

It was in the wake of these developments that in June 1984 the governments of Malawi, Mozambique and Zimbabwe formed a joint security committee 13. The aim of the committee was to monitor operations on a day-to-day basis and to attempt to remove all security threats along the Tete Corridor. Zimbabwe's First Mechanised Battalion was ordered to move into Mozambique and they established their headquarters in Tete thereby securing the strategic bridge crossing the Zambezi River. In 1985, President Samora Machel of Mozambique formally requested the governments of Tanzania and Zimbabwe to contribute troops for "the restoration of law and order" in Mozambique. This led to the deployment of Tanzanian troops north of the Zambezi river and Zimbabwean troops to the south.

The decision to send Zimbabwean troops to help restore law and order in Mozambique was partly influenced by Zimbabwe's close relationship with the Mozambican government which dates back to FRELIMO's assistance during Zimbabwe's war of liberation. There was also the underlying fact that FRELIMO and ZANU shared a common Marxist ideology of scientific socialism. The South Africa-backed RENAMO professed to be an anti-communist movement, as did Jonas Savimbi's UNITA movement, which was fighting against the Marxist MPLA government of Angola. There was thus an ideological alliance of the Maputo – Harare – Luanda axis, with support for these governments from the Soviet Union. The fact that the United States of America was providing covert and overt support to opposition movements such as UNITA in Angola and RENAMO in Mozambique reflected the extension of the Cold War to Southern Africa.

Angola (United Nations Angola Verification Missions) 
There were three United Nations Missions to Angola under UNAVEM.  UNAVEM I (January 1989 to June 1991) and UNAVEM II (May/June 1991 to February 1995) involved small numbers of unarmed military observers.  Brigadier Michael Nyambuya of Zimbabwe was Chief Military Observer of UNAVEM II between December 1992 and July 1993.  During UNAVEM III a Zimbabwean battalion was deployed to eastern Angola, based in the town of Saurimo. Nine Zimbabwean peacekeepers died during the UNAVEM deployments.

Angolan Civil War 
After several hints, some of which the Zimbabwean Government denied, for the first time the ZDF Commander, General Constantine Chiwenga, acknowledged ZNA involvement in the Angolan Civil War.

It was reported that Zimbabwe had more than 2,000 combat troops, including 20 military intelligence officers, deployed in Angola whose presence has helped the Angolan Armed Forces to overrun Jonas Savimbi's strongholds, according to reports reaching the Zimbabwe Independent.

Somalia (United Nations Operation in Somalia II) 

Zimbabwe deployed a national contingent to UNOSOM II on 15 January 1993.  The initial deployment comprised an infantry company group of 163 personnel under Major Vitalis Chigume.  By June 1993 the deployment had built up to a full battalion of 939 soldiers.  This battalion was rotated every six months until October 1994, when new deployments ceased, and the last Zimbabweans were finally withdrawn in early 1995.

Four Zimbabweans lost their lives during the UNOSOM mission in Somalia.  These included Private Themba Moyo, who was killed by local militia in an altercation during August 1994.

Second Congo War, 1998 to 2002 (SADC Operation Sovereign Legitimacy)

Equatorial Guinea, 2015 to present 

In January 2015 a contingent of Zimbabwe Defence Forces and Zimbabwe Republic Police personnel, reportedly including the Commando Anti-Terrorism Unit, were deployed to Equatorial Guinea to provide security and support during the Africa Cup of Nations tournament.  The deployment followed a bi-lateral agreement between the two countries' heads of state and was code named Restoring African Pride.  Equatorial Guinea had agreed to host the prestigious tournament at the last minute after the original host country, Morocco, pulled out.

This initial deployment to Equatorial Guinea was followed from November 2015 by an ongoing training mission.  When one ZDF training contingent returned to Harare in January 2017, following a year-long deployment to Equatorial Guinea, it was suggested by senior ministers that was "not the end of the mission".

In June 2018, after Zimbabwean President Robert Mugabe had been replaced by President Emmerson Mnangagwa, it was reported that the ZDF training mission to Equatorial Guinea was continuing. A photograph published at the time shows Zimbabwean soldiers wearing AU brassards, suggesting the training mission had African Union endorsement.

Operation Restore Legacy, 2017 

Between 13 November and 18 December 2017 the Zimbabwe Defence Forces deployed in a dramatic intervention in domestic politics to force the resignation of long-time President Robert Mugabe. The operation was stated to have the objective of removing criminal elements that had surrounded the President, 'resulting in anxiety and despondency among the public'. This referred to a number of politicians from the ruling ZANU-PF party that supported President Mugabe's wife and seemed intent on manoeuvering her into the presidency once her aging husband could no longer fulfil that role.  Senior members of the defence forces and ZANU-PF reportedly saw this group as a threat to their authority and their own plans, and believed the group did not represent the generation that had suffered during the liberation war of 1966−1980.  The defence forces arrested several members of the group and, while showing respect to the President, placed Mugabe under effective house arrest until he agreed to resign from the presidency.  Emmerson Mnangagwa, a former vice-president and senior ZANU-PF member, was later appointed as president and senior generals were rewarded with promotion or political appointment.

Organisation

Formations

The Zimbabwe National Army has eight brigade-sized formations, plus two district commands.  These are 1 to 5 Infantry Brigades, Presidential Guard Brigade, Mechanised Brigade and Artillery Brigade, Harare District and Bulawayo District.

1 Infantry Brigade, Khumalo Barracks, Bulawayo (Brig. Gen. Augustine Chiperwe)
2 Infantry Brigade, Kaguyi Barracks (formerly Old Cranborne Barracks), Harare (Brig. Gen. Fidelis Mhonda)
3 Infantry Brigade, Herbert Chitepo Barracks, Mutare (Brig. Gen. Eliah Bandama, until his death on 11 July 2014)
4 Infantry Brigade, Gava Musungwa Zvinavashe Barracks, Masvingo (Brig. Gen. Exesbios Tshuma)
5 Infantry Brigade, Ngezi Barracks, Kwekwe (Brig. Gen. Justin Mujaji, from 1 March 2012)  Deputy Commander to February 2014 was Col. Morgan Mzilikazi  Current Deputy Commander may be Col. Svitswa.
Presidential Guard Brigade, Dzivarasekwa Barracks, Harare (Brig. Gen. Fidelis Mhunda)
Mechanised Brigade, Inkomo Barracks, Harare (Maj. Gen. Paul Chima, Deputy Brigade Commander Col. Charles Shumba)
Artillery Brigade, Domboshava (Brig. Gen. Stanley Mangena), Deputy Brigade Commander Col. Everson Nyamangodo.
Harare District.  Deputy Commander in 2014 was Lt. Col. Posani Matsaka.
Bulawayo District. (Col. Exsebios Vusa Tshuma, although he is more recently reported as promoted to 4 Inf Bde commander).

One, now dated, web publication gave the infantry brigade organisation as:

Three Combat Groups with 35 APCs each
Reconnaissance Company (12 EE-9 Cascavel)
Signals Company
Mortar Battery (6 81/82-mm or 120-mm)
SAM 3 Advanced battery
Engineer company
Supply and transport
Workshop
Medical units

Units

1 Parachute Battalion (or Parachute Regiment) – Inkomo Barracks, Nyabira (Lt. Col. Jameson Bishi). Formed in 1981 and distinguished by maroon berets.
1 Commando Battalion (or Commando Regiment) – Charles Gumbo Barracks, Harare (Lt. Col. Lazarus Kativhu). Formed in 1981 and distinguished by 'tartan green' berets.
Special Air Service (Lt. Col. Casper Nyagura)
Mounted Infantry Regiment – Amoth Norbert Chingombe Barracks, Inkomo
1 Presidential Guard Battalion – State House, Harare. Distinguished by yellow berets.
2 Presidential Guard Battalion – Dzivarasekwa Barracks, Harare. Distinguished by yellow berets.
Armoured Regiment – Nkomo Barracks, Harare
1 Mechanised Battalion – Inkomo (Lt. Col. Colleen Mafika, from January 2018)
2 Mechanized Battalion – Darwendale.
11 Combat Group – Induna Barracks, Bulawayo (Lt. Col. Oscar Tshuma) Note: Video footage of 1 Brigade colours on parade shows the correct titles of units are '11 Combat Group' and '12 Infantry Battalion'.
12 Infantry Battalion – Hwange
13 Reserve Force Battalion – Plumtree?
21 Combat Group – Mutoko
22 Infantry Battalion (Lt Col Terryson Marufu) – Mudzi
23 Combat Group – Magunje
31 Combat Group – Mutare
32 Combat Group – Tsanzaguru (Maj. Stephen Tadius Chifamba Rtd 2004), Rusape.
33 Combat Group – Changadzi Barracks, Mutare (or Chipinge)
41 Combat Group – Masvingo Barracks, Masvingo
42 Combat Group – Mupandawana, Gutu
43 Infantry Battalion (Combat Group? Buffalo Range, Chiredzi Rutenga (or Masvingo)
51 Infantry Battalion (Combat Group?) – Dadaya, Zvishavane (or Battlefields, Ngezi)
52 Infantry Battalion (Combat Group?) – Battlefields, Ngezi 
53 Infantry Battalion – Battlefields, Ngezi
1 Field Regiment (Lt. Col. Chitungo) – Alphida Farm, Domboshawa 
2 Field Regiment – Alphida Farm, Domboshawa 
1 Air Defence Artillery Regiment(Lt. Col Last Sithole) – Redcliff Barracks (formerly Ponderossa Barracks), Redcliff
1 Engineer Regiment – Pomona Barracks, Harare
2 Engineer Regiment – Pomona Barracks, Harare
Engineering Construction Regiment – Pomona Barracks, Harare.
National Demining Squadron
3 Brigade Engineers (Maj. Chamunorwa Gambiza)
4 Brigade Engineer Squadron (Maj. Fikilephi Dube)
5 Brigade Engineers – Kwekwe
Boat Squadron (part of the Special Forces of Zimbabwe) – Nyami-Nyami, Kariba
Central Ammunition Depot (CAD) – Darwendale
Bulawayo Ordnance (Lt. Col. W. Mushawarima)

Training establishments 

Zimbabwe National Defence University – Harare
Zimbabwe Staff College – Josiah Magama Tongogara Barracks, Harare
Zimbabwe Military Academy (ZMA) – Gweru
Zimbabwe School of Infantry (Z S Inf) – Mbalabala
All Arms Battle School (AABS) – Nyanga
Recruit Training Depot (RTD) – Imbizo Barracks, Bulawayo 
Field Artillery Training School (Lt. Col I Chitungo)- Ngezi Barracks, Battlefields 
Zimbabwe School of Military Engineering (ZSME) – Pomona Barracks, Harare.
Armour Training School – Inkomo Barracks, Nyabira
Bomb Range Training Camp – Esigodini
Lazy Nine Training Ground – Shurugwi
Katanga Range – Kwekwe
Godhlwayo Training Area – Matabeleland North
Wafa-Wafa Commando Training Grounds – Kariba.
1.2 Battalion Satellite Training Centre – Hwange.
2.3 Combat Group Satellite Training Centre – Magunje.
53 Infantry Battalion Recruit Satellite Training Centre – Battlefields.
School of Signals
School of Military Intelligence
Instructors Training School
Military School of Music 
Medical Training School
Ordnance and Transport Training School
School of Military Police
Information Technology Training School
School of Logistics
Pay Corps Training School
Army School of Physical Training and Sports (Commandant: Lt. Col. Camble Sithole)

Personnel 

These are the Zimbabwe National Army ranks authorised for use today and their equivalent Commonwealth designations. The ranking order is largely based on the British system, with the Air Force of Zimbabwe maintaining separate titles inherited from the Rhodesian Air Force.

Commissioned Officers 

The ZNA lost many of its best trained and experienced officers in the early 1990s, failing to recruit or instruct enough personnel to make up for the imbalance caused by death, emigration, or retirement. By the outbreak of the Second Congo War, only a handful of the officer corps had seen action. An interim measure was the rapid promotion of troops from non-combat units, often selected for their political connections rather than leadership competence. Theoretically, promotions continue to be based on the pre-independence system, which dictates officers below the rank of lieutenant colonel pass a proficiency examination to qualify for advancement. In times of downscaling, those with poorer marks must retire or accept an immediate demotion.

Previous Army Commanders
Lt. Gen. Edzai Absolom Chanyuka Chimonyo (December 2017 to July 2021).
Lt. Gen. Philip Valerio Sibanda (January 2004 to December 2017)
Lt. Gen. Constantine Guveya Chiwenga (July 1994 to 31 December 2003)
Lt. Gen. Vitalis M. 'Fox' Gava Zvinavashe (1992 to 1994)
Gen. T. R. Solomon Mujuru (1981 to 1992)
Lt. Gen. Alistair ‘Sandy’ C. L. Maclean  (18 April 1980 to 1981)

Enlisted personnel

Equipment 

At its formation in 1980, the ZNA was overburdened with a surplus of arms due to having inherited the inventories of the former Rhodesian Army as well as the two constituent insurgent factions of the Patriotic Front. Especially problematic was the integration of Soviet and Chinese weapons with the Rhodesian NATO standard arms, which had different gauges and calibers. The Zimbabwean government initially ordered that the guerrillas' Soviet or Chinese arms be placed into storage, hoping to simplify maintenance and logistics by re-issuing only former Rhodesian weapons and ammunition. This decision was later overturned when it became clear that the Rhodesian era weapons were insufficient to equip the ZNA, especially after a significant percentage of its 7.62×51mm NATO ammunition stockpiles were destroyed in a sabotage action around 1981. The guerrillas' former arms were brought out of storage and re-issued to individual units, being supplemented by additional supplies of Soviet-style arms from North Korea. Serious logistical difficulties resulted from the use of such a menagerie of disparate equipment within individual battalions, forcing the ZNA to standardize equipment on the battalion and later the brigade level. Unfortunately this resulted in additional problems, such as the use of separate communications equipment in certain brigades which were otherwise incompatible with those of other units.

The People's Republic of China emerged as the ZNA's largest external supplier of arms during the 1980s. Most of the new artillery, tanks, and APCs accepted into service after 1981 were of Chinese origin. Nevertheless, the ZNA continued to look to a number of diverse suppliers to meet its needs, including member states of the European Union and the Commonwealth of Independent States. Domestic production of small arms and ammunition, including multiple rocket launchers, small arms ammunition, artillery shells, and hand grenades, commenced for the ZNA in the mid-1980s through Zimbabwe Defence Industries (ZDI).

The operational readiness and serviceability rate of the army's weapons systems began undergoing a decline during the Second Congo War, due to an inability to source new parts and ammunition at a pace sufficient to keep up with wartime wear. Development loans to the Zimbabwean government by the World Bank and the International Monetary Fund were suspended when the ZNA was accused of diverting the money into the war effort. The ZNA was also badly affected by a subsequent arms embargo imposed by the EU due to allegations of human rights abuses. One consequence of the embargo was that the ZNA was forced to retire much of its technical equipment, namely radios, of Western origin. The logistics problem was further exacerbated during the collapse of the Zimbabwean dollar against major world currencies, which led to further budgetary restraints. Over half the army's tanks and armoured vehicles were rendered unserviceable due to a lack of funds to source spare parts, fuel, or training ammunition. To raise funds, the ZNA was forced to auction off much of its trailers, ammunition trucks, and engineering vehicles. Army ammunition continued to be sourced from ZDI, but the latter suspended operations in 2015 when the ZNA defaulted on its payments.

In February 2017, Zimbabwean officials revealed that the army and air force were heavily in debt with Chinese creditors due to defaulting on payments for Chinese arms. The government granted a number of domestic platinum claims to a Chinese defence contractor, Norinco, to help cover the existing debt.

Small arms

Heavy weapons

Vehicles

See also 
 Central Intelligence Organisation
 Ministry of Defence (Zimbabwe)
 National Youth Service (Zimbabwe)
 Zimbabwe Defence Industries
 Rhodesian Security Forces
 Special Forces of Zimbabwe
 Zimbabwean Fifth Brigade
 Zimbabwe Republic Police

Endnotes

Bibliography 
Zimbabwe
ZNA Demonstrates ATGM
MILITARISATION OF ZIMBABWE: Does the opposition stand a chance?
Alao, Abiodun, "Mugabe and the Politics and Diplomacy of Security in Zimbabwe"
Alao, Abiodun (1995) The Metamorphosis of the ‘Unorthodox’: The Integration and Early Development of the Zimbabwean National Army. In: Bhebe, N. & Ranger, T. (eds) Soldiers in Zimbabwe’s Liberation War. Volume 1. University of Zimbabwe Publications, Harare: 104–117.  
Binda, A. (2007) Masoja: The History of the Rhodesian African Rifles and its Forerunner, the Rhodesia Native Regiment. Thirty Degrees South Publishers Pty Ltd, Johannesburg.
Chitiyo, K. & Rupiya, M.  (2005)  Tracking Zimbabwe's political history: the Zimbabwe Defence Force from 1980 to 2005.  In: Rupiya, M. (ed.) Evolutions and Revolutions: A Contemporary History of Militaries in Southern Africa.  Institute for Security Studies, Pretoria: 331–363.  
Cooper, Tom (2013) Africa@War Volume 14: Great Lakes Conflagration – The Second Congo War, 1998–2003. Helion & Co Ltd, England, and Thirty Degrees South Publishers Pty Ltd, Johannesburg.

Godfrey Maringira, "Politicization and resistance in the Zimbabwean national army," African Affairs, Volume 116, Issue 462, 1 January 2017, Pages 18–38, .
Rupiah, Martin, Lt. Col.  (1995)  Peacekeeping operations: The Zimbabwean experience.  In: Shaw, M. & Celliers, J. (eds), South Africa and Peacekeeping in Africa, Volume 1. Institute for Defence Policy, Halfway House, South Africa: 111–125.

External links 

 Zna.gov.zw – Zimbabwe National Army official website
 Zna/recruitment – official recruiting site
 MOD.gov.zw  – Ministry of Defence
 Zimbabwechildsoldiers.com – Zimbabwe Child Soldiers Victim Foundation
 Zimbabwedefence.com – Unofficial Zimbabwe Defence Forces website

Armies by country
Military of Zimbabwe
Military units and formations established in 1980
1980 establishments in Zimbabwe